FuboTV Inc. (stylized as fuboTV) is an American streaming television service serving customers in the United States, Canada, and Spain that focuses primarily on channels that distribute live sports. Depending on country, channels offered by Fubo may potentially include access to EPL, NFL, MLB, NBA, NHL, MLS, CPL and international football, plus news, network television series and movies.

Launched on January 1, 2015, as a soccer streaming service, FuboTV changed to an all-sports service in 2017 and then to a virtual multichannel video programming distributor (vMVPD) model. As a vMVPD, FuboTV still markets itself as a sports-first service, but it has since expanded its programming to include channels that fall under other genres, including ones with reality shows, premium movies and cable news.

As of 2018, the service was available in the United States, Canada and Spain. In the U.S., there are several service options with different channel lineups, including a base package of over 100 linear content channels, which also include free content streams that are found on competing services. A number of add-on packages are also available for viewers who want more programming options, Spanish-language content, premium movie networks or additional features.

FuboTV said it had around 1.231 million subscribers in North America by its third financial quarter of 2022.

History 
FuboTV was co-founded in January 2015 by David Gandler (CEO), Alberto Horihuela (CMO) and Sung Ho Choi. At launch, FuboTV cost $7 per month and offered live streams from soccer-centric channels. In early 2017, Fubo pivoted to become a broader streaming service, adding entertainment and news programming in addition to soccer and sports from NFL, NBA, MLB and NHL. During its first five years, investors in FuboTV include AMC Networks, Luminari Capital, Northzone, Sky, and Scripps Networks Interactive. FuboTV was named to Forbes’ Next Billion-Dollar Startups list in 2019.

According to Fast Company, FuboTV still calls itself *sports-first", but instead of being "the Netflix of soccer", it is pitching itself as a direct competitor to cable television and live-streaming bundles such as Sling TV and AT&T TV. FuboTV was the first live-TV streaming service to support 4K HDR video (2018 World Cup), and was the first to adopt an industry standard for handling sports blackouts.

In December 2018, Fubo announced that it was going to expand into Spain.

2019 
On February 20, 2019, it was announced that channels from Viacom Networks would be added on April 30, 2019, though these networks do not feature sports content. ViacomCBS (now Paramount Global) does own an undisclosed stake in fuboTV, and future VCBS deals will also include CBS carriage.

On March 5, 2019, FuboTV expanded its 4K support to the Big Ten Network. In May 2019, fuboTV and FanDuel partnered to integrate sports betting data on the live TV streaming service. The deal included carriage of Fanduel's horse racing networks, TVG and TVG2.

On June 19, 2019, FuboTV announced that it will be adding the Discovery Networks, joining the line up of Scripps Networks that were acquired by Discovery.

2020 
ViacomCBS channels launched on fuboTV in Spain in 2020.

On January 1, 2020, FuboTV dropped the Fox Sports Networks, citing increasing carriage costs after the acquisition of the channels by the Sinclair Broadcast Group.

FuboTV launched the NHL Network on March 9, 2020, with plans to add the MLB Network and MLB Strike Zone, allowing it to have all four professional sports league networks on its platform.

On March 23, 2020, fuboTV was acquired by FaceBank Group, a publicly listed virtual entertainment technology company founded by media technology entrepreneur John Textor. fuboTV was renamed fuboTV Media, Inc., and Facebank Group was renamed fuboTV, Inc., to be led by original fuboTV CEO David Gandler. According to the article, fuboTV plans to leverage Facebank's IP portfolio to create new streaming experiences for consumers and also expand internationally. FaceBank is traded on the OTC exchange and, following the merger, Gandler noted the company plans to uplist to a major stock exchange.  Following its merger with FaceBank Group, FuboTV began trading on the OTC under the ticker symbol FUBO.

In the months following the merger, John Textor resigned his post as Executive Chairman, and the company named former Warner Music Group Chairman Edgar Bronfman Jr. as Executive Chairman of the Board. Other directors, such as early Spotify investor Par-Jorgen Parson and venture capitalist Daniel Leff were also named to the Board. All three were early investors in FuboTV.

In June 2020, FuboTV announced a long-awaited deal with Disney Media Networks to bring ESPN Inc., and Walt Disney Television (including ESPN and its networks and ABC, along with children's networks such as Disney Channel) to the sports-focused streaming service sometime in the summer. The deal was to make FuboTV a "force in sports streaming," according to Fortune. It would go live on August 1. On July 1, 2020, FuboTV dropped WarnerMedia networks, including CNN, TBS and TNT.

On September 15, 2020, FuboTV said it expected to close 2020 with 410,000–420,000 subscribers as a result of the return of sports during the COVID-19 pandemic. The company also announced it was approved to list on the New York Stock Exchange (NYSE) "conditional upon successful pricing of this offering, under the ticker symbol FUBO."

On October 7, 2020, fuboTV completed its initial public offering as a New York Stock Exchange company, raising roughly $183 million in proceeds. FuboTV began trading on the NYSE under the ticker symbol "FUBO" on October 8, 2020, as fuboTV shares jumped 10% in their market debut.

FuboTV delivered what it said was record revenue and subscriber numbers during the third quarter of 2020. The company also announced its plans to enter the online sports wagering market with details to be announced.

In December 2020, FuboTV acquired Balto Sports, which owns contest automation software. The company said the acquisition marked the first step of its online wagering strategy, which will start with free to play games and then expand into wagering integrated with its live streaming video.

FuboTV added more premium entertainment with the launch of EPIX and STARZ channels in December 2020. It also reached an agreement with Nexstar Media Group to begin carrying WGN America in January 2021.

2021 

In January, FuboTV announced more details of its expansion into online sports wagering. With the December 2020 Balto Sports acquisition, the company said it plans to launch a free to play gaming app by the summer of 2021. The app will be available to all consumers nationwide, whether they are FuboTV subscribers or not. The company also said it plans to integrate free gaming into the FuboTV platform. Additionally, FuboTV announced it intends to acquire sports gaming company Vigtory and will launch its own sportsbook before the end of the year. With the Vigtory acquisition, FuboTV will also receive Vigtory's pipeline of market access deals, including a completed agreement with Iowa through Casino Queen. Like free gaming, the company said it plans to launch the sportsbook as an app first before integrating it into the FuboTV user experience. FuboTV CEO told The Wall Street Journal he expects sports wagering to not only generate more revenue for FuboTV but also make it more likely that customers will pay closer attention to sports and tune in more often.

In its fourth quarter 2020 earnings results reported in March 2021, FuboTV said it exceeded $100 million in quarterly revenue for the first time.

Also during its 2020 earnings report, FuboTV said it would launch free-to-play predictive gaming in the third quarter 2021. FuboTV also announced it closed the previously announced Vigtory acquisition and had established Fubo Gaming to oversee its entry into online sports wagering. Fubo Gaming is expected to launch Fubo Sportsbook in the fourth quarter 2021. Fubo also announced it signed agreements with the MLB and NBA to become an Authorized Gaming Operator of each league. These agreements will provide access to official data and include league marks and logos within Fubo Sportsbook once it is rolled out.

FuboTV announced in May 2021 that the first quarter was its strongest in its history, delivering $119.7 million in revenue, an increase of 135% year-over-year, and growing total subscribers to 590,430, up 105% year-over-year. CEO David Gandler called the quarter an "inflection point" for FuboTV as it was the first time the company grew revenue and subscribers sequentially in any first quarter despite seasonality trends.

On June 1, Fast Company reported FuboTV would begin beta testing predictive, free-to-play games and a live stats feature called FanView, both integrated into its streaming video. The beta test would begin during FuboTV's exclusive streams of the South American CONMEBOL 2022 FIFA World Cup qualifying matches that month. The company said they plan to officially launch free gaming timed to the NFL season. FuboTV also said it expects gaming to be an engagement driver and noted it is the first step on its gaming roadmap, which will include the launch of Fubo Sportsbook later in 2021. On June 30, 2021, FuboTV dropped services from A&E Networks, among them included History, A&E and Lifetime.

FuboTV was added to the Russell 2000 Index at the conclusion of the 2021 Russell indexes annual reconstitution in June 2021. In November, FuboTV said that it had reached the one million subscriber mark.

FuboTV launched Fubo Sportsbook, a mobile wagering app integrated with fuboTV's live TV streaming platform, on November 3. The company launched the app in Iowa and said more states are to follow. The company announced they had reached one million subscribers on their third quarter 2021 earnings call. FuboTV also announced it had signed an agreement to acquire France's leading live TV streaming platform, Molotov TV, to fuel its international expansion along with Indian AI startup edisn.ai.

2022 

In January 2022, FuboTV acquired the Canadian media rights to the Premier League, replacing DAZN.

The company's subsidiary, Fubo Gaming, announced in early February 2022 it had completed 10 market access for Fubo Sportsbook (Arizona, Indiana, Iowa, Louisiana, Mississippi, Missouri, New Jersey, Ohio, Pennsylvania and Texas) and was live in two states (Arizona, Iowa). It promised to launch in additional states, pending requisite regulatory approvals.

On May 25, 2022, GAC Living  became available on FuboTV.

FuboTV launched pick'em games in June 2022. The company said the free games would be live with select sports directly from its home page. Additionally, FuboTV subscribers can also scan a QR code in the TV watching experience to access Fubo Sportsbook and place real money wagers aligned with their picks. The sportsbook integration is was live in the markets where Fubo Sportsbook operates, according to the company.

In August 2022, FuboTV said it was putting its sports wagering business under a strategic review. The company abandoned its sportsbook entirely by October.

Ryan Reynolds took an equity stake in FuboTV in August 2022. Reynolds, his Maximum Effort studio and Fubo announced a co-production partnership that will include the launch of the Maximum Effort Channel on FuboTV. Reynolds and his team will create original content for the forthcoming channel.

In December 2022, FuboTV announced content partnerships with Scripps Networks and Sinclair Broadcast Group's 19 Bally Sports regional sports networks. Fubo promised the channels would launch "in the coming weeks," bringing the total number of regional sports channels on the service to over 35.

On December 31, 2022, FuboTV removed channels owned and operated by AMC Networks, including AMC, BBC America, BBC World News, IFC, We TV and Sundance. In a letter to consumers, FuboTV said it would not provide refunds or credits to customers who prepaid for service.

2023 
On January 6, 2023, FuboTV began notifying subscribers that they would raise their base subscription package to $74.99 per month. Additionally, for the first time, FuboTV rolled out a regional sports network fee to all subscribers who received such a channel. Customers with one regional sports channel will pay $10.99 a month, while customers who have two or more of those channels will pay $13.99 per month.

Fubo Sports Network 

On June 27, 2019, FuboTV announced it launched a free ad supported linear channel called fubo Sports Network. The network is free to consumers on XUMO. fubo Sports Network later launched on smart TVs like Samsung TV Plus and LG Channels powered by XUMO and on The Roku Channel.

After the initial soft-launch, the company announced on September 9, 2019, that it would be adding a slate of sports-oriented original programming to fubo Sports Network. Including "Call It A Night" and "Drinks With Binks," two talk shows hosted by journalist and comedian Julie Stewart-Binks; "The Cooligans," a soccer talk show hosted by New York comedians Alexis Guerreros and Christian Polanco; and "The Players' Lounge" hosted by Soccer Hall of Fame inductee Cobi Jones and PJ Harrison. The company also made the live stream of fubo Sports Network available at the fubo Sports Network website fubo Sports Network was added to the new Vizio Channels platform in April 2020.

The company announced a partnership with former NBA All Star Gilbert Arenas to bring his "No Chill" podcast to fubo Sports Network as a weekly vodcast beginning May 2020. Retitled "No Chill with Gilbert Arenas," the show features Arenas and co-host Mike Botticello interviewing athletes, coaches and celebrities. As of May 19, 2020, Fubo Sports Network is available on 75 million devices, according to the company.

On September 10, 2020, professional wrestling promotion Major League Wrestling (MLW) announced that their weekly flagship, MLW Fusion, would move to Fubo Sports Network on November 18. In May 2021, Fubo Sports Network announced it has partnered with Terrell Owens and Matthew Hatchette to turn their podcast, Getcha Popcorn Ready, into a TV show. The new show will begin airing on Fubo Sports Network later this year.

Features 
FuboTV built its tech stack internally and, in 2017, launched features like Cloud DVR storage, pausing and unpausing live streams and lookback of previously aired content for 72 hours FuboTV offers two simultaneous streams as part of its base subscription package and, in March 2018, introduced a third stream for $5.99 per month.

FuboTV became the second over-the-top internet television service to get integrated to the TV app on Apple TV, iPhone, and iPad. FuboTV guide is not compatible with access technologies such as iOS Voice Over, Android Talk Back and JAWS.

Ratings
FuboTV earned the highest score in J.D. Power's customer satisfaction survey of live TV streaming providers in 2022, with 789 points in aggregate on a scale of 1,000 possible points, three points higher than Dish Network's Sling TV.

Supported devices

TV-connected 
 Apple TV (4th Generation and newer)
 Roku 
 Amazon Fire TV
 Android TV
 Samsung Smart TV (beta)
 LG Smart TV
 Hisense Smart TV
 Vizio SmartCast
 Xbox One
 Xbox Series X/S

Mobile 
 iOS mobile devices
 Android mobile devices
 Chromecast (iOS and Android)

Computer 
 Windows, Mac, and Linux with a compatible browser.

References

External links
 

2015 establishments in New York City
Internet television streaming services
Internet properties established in 2015
Companies listed on the New York Stock Exchange
2020 initial public offerings
Publicly traded companies based in New York City